Tangerine Bowl may refer to:

 Tangerine Bowl (1947–1982), a college football bowl game now known as the Citrus Bowl
 Mazda Tangerine Bowl (2001–2003), three editions of the college football bowl game now known as the Cheez-It Bowl
 Tangerine Bowl (stadium), now known as Camping World Stadium; known as the Tangerine Bowl or Tangerine Bowl Stadium from 1947 to 1975